Šeteniai (Šateiniai, formerly) is a village in the Kėdainiai District Municipality, Lithuania. According to the 2011 census, the village had a population of 31 people.

Šeteniai is the birthplace of the Polish poet Czesław Miłosz. The Czesław Miłosz Cultural Center with an exhibition dedicated to Miłosz was opened on June 12, 1999. The center is located in the former barn of the manor where Miłosz was born. The center is used for cultural activities, conferences, and meetings. It is surrounded by a park showcasing wood carvings by international artists.

History
The Šeteniai Manor was likely established in the early 18th century. At the end of the 19th century there were 2 folwarks in Šeteniai, one was a property of the Siručiai (owners of the Sirutiškis manor), another was a property of the Kognovickiai (the Lančiūnava manor). Buildings of the former manor were destroyed in the 1950s.

Demographics

Notable people 
 Juozas Urbšys (1896–1991), last interbellum Lithuanian Minister of Foreign Affairs
 Czesław Miłosz (1911–2004), Polish poet, writer and translator, Nobel Prize laureate

Images

References

Villages in Kaunas County
Kėdainiai District Municipality